Karl Ferdinand Wimar (also known as Charles Wimar and Carl Wimar; 20 February 1828 – 28 November 1862), was a German-American painter who concentrated on Native Americans in the West and the great herds of buffalo.

He is known for an early painting of a colonial incident: his The Abduction of Boone's Daughter by the Indians (1855–56), a depiction of the 1776 capture near Boonesborough, Kentucky of Jemima Boone and two other girls by a Cherokee-Shawnee raiding party.

Early life and education
Born in Siegburg, Germany, Wimar immigrated to the United States at the age of 15 with his family. They settled in St. Louis, Missouri, which attracted numerous German immigrants in the major 19th century emigration.

In 1846 he began studying painting with Leon Pomarede.  Together they traveled up the Mississippi River.  In 1852 he went to the Düsseldorf Academy to study with Emanuel Leutze. He is associated with the Düsseldorf school of painting.

Career
Wimar returned to St. Louis in 1856. About this time, he painted a notable incident from the colonial era, The Abduction of Boone's Daughter by the Indians (1855–1856).  It was one of his first works to achieve notice in the United States.  A recent exhibit at the Amon Carter Museum described the painting as showing five Indians and Jemima in a canoe, each wondering when rescuers would come for her.

Wimar primarily painted the themes of Indian life on the Great Plains, showing the Native American hunts of buffalo and other activities related to their nomadic lives. He also painted scenes of the emigrant wagon trains that carried pioneer settlers across the western expanses.

He made two long trips in 1858 and 1859 up the Missouri River, and was inspired by his experiences and observations of Native American life.  He also traveled up the Mississippi.

Among Wimar's best-known works are murals painted in 1861 in the Rotunda of the St. Louis Court House.  The building is now part of the Gateway Arch National Park.

Works

References

External links

carlwimar.com, "The Charles (Carl) Ferdinand Wimar Research Project"
fineoldart.com, biography "Carl Wimar"
Museo Thyssen-Bornemisza Biography and Works: Karl Ferdinand Wimar

1828 births
1862 deaths
19th-century American painters
American male painters
Artists from St. Louis
19th-century German painters
19th-century American male artists
German male painters
Kunstakademie Düsseldorf alumni
German emigrants to the United States
People from Siegburg
Painters from Missouri
Düsseldorf school of painting